Bagh-e Malek (also Romanized as Bāgh-e Malek and Bāgh Malek) is a village in Kiskan Rural District, in the Central District of Baft County, Kerman Province, Iran. At the 2006 census, its population was 60, in 23 families.

References 

Populated places in Baft County